The mixed doubles tournament of the 2017 Asian Junior Badminton Championships was held from July 26 to 30. The defending champions of the last edition were He Jiting and Du Yue from China. The host pair, No 5. seeds Rehan Naufal Kusharjanto and Siti Fadia Silva Ramadhanti claim the title after defeat the No. 3 seed from South Korea Na Sung-seung and Seong Ah-yeong in rubber games with the score 21–19, 19–21, 21–9.

Seeded

 Rinov Rivaldy / Angelica Wiratama (third round)
 Kim Moon-jun / Lee Yu-rim (third round)
 Na Sung-seung / Seong Ah-yeong (Finals)
 Ng Eng Cheong / Toh Ee Wei (third round)
 Rehan Naufal Kusharjanto / Siti Fadia Silva Ramadhanti (champion)
 Chang Yee Jun / Pearly Tan Koong Le (quarterfinals)
 Wang Chan / Kim Min-ji (semifinals)
 Yeremia Rambitan / Ribka Sugiarto (third round)

Draw

Finals

Top half

Section 1

Section 2

Section 3

Section 4

Bottom half

Section 5

Section 6

Section 7

Section 8

References

External links 
Main Draw

Mixed
Asia Junior